The Playbook is a half-hour comedy series produced by Hip TV Inc. and hosted by Donald Faison for Spike TV.

The Playbook revolves around a typical young male trying to figure out dating and relationships as if they were plays in a sports playbook.

The original pilot for the series debuted on February 3, 2005 and featured Steve Sobel as host. When Spike TV picked up the series, Donald Faison was hired to replace Steve Sobel as the series host. No more than ten episodes were produced before the series was cancelled.

External links 
 

2000s American comedy television series
2005 American television series debuts
2006 American television series endings
Spike (TV network) original programming